Tracey Jackson (born May 12, 1958, in Los Angeles California) is an American author, blogger, screenwriter, film director and producer.

Career and personal life
She has published two books and has written several feature-length screenplays, including the romantic comedy films The Other End of the Line (2008) and Confessions of a Shopaholic (2009). Jackson also created the 1990 Fox TV series Babes.

She blogs on her personal website and for websites including The Huffington Post and wowOwow, and is married to Glenn Horowitz, a bookseller in New York.

Bibliography
 Between a Rock and a Hot Place: Why Fifty Is Not the New Thirty (2012)
 Gratitude and Trust: Six Affirmations That Will Change Your Life (2014, with Paul Williams)

Filmography

As actor
 Heartburn (1986, as Hairdresser's Friend)

Screenplays
 Babes (1990, 1 episode)
 The Guru (2002)
 The Other End of the Line (2008)
 Confessions of a Shopaholic (2009, with Tim Firth and Kayla Alpert)
 Lucky Ducks (2009, also written and directed)

See also

References

External links
 , Jackson's official website
 
 

Place of birth missing (living people)
1958 births
20th-century American writers
20th-century American women writers
21st-century American writers
21st-century American women writers
American bloggers
American women screenwriters
Living people
Writers from Manhattan
American women bloggers
Writers from Los Angeles
Screenwriters from New York (state)
Screenwriters from California